Humes Glacier is located in the Olympic Mountains in Olympic National Park, approximately  southeast of the summit of Mount Olympus.

It was named by members of The Mountaineers climbing club in 1907 for Grant and Will Humes, who were guides, explorers, and pack-train operators.

See also
List of glaciers in the United States

Further reading 
 Robert Wood, Olympic Mountains Trail Guide: National Park and National Forest, P 292
 Olympic Mountain Rescue (Society), Climber's Guide to the Olympic Mountains, PP 24, 165, 171, 173
 Olympic Mountain Rescue, Olympic Mountains: A Climbing Guide, P 175
 J.L. Riedel, Steve Wilson, William Baccus, Michael Larrabee, T.J. Fudge, Andrew Fountain, Glacier status and contribution to streamflow in the Olympic Mountains, Washington, USA, Journal of Glaciology, Volume 61, Issue 225 2015 , pp. 8–16

References

Glaciers of the Olympic Mountains
Glaciers of Jefferson County, Washington
Glaciers of Washington (state)